Niyar or Neyar or Niar or Nayyer or Neyer may refer to:
 Niyar, Ardabil
 Niyar, Hamadan
 Niyar, Kurdistan
 Niyar, South Khorasan